Diploid-triploid mosaicism (DTM) is a chromosome disorder. Individuals with diploid-triploid syndrome have some cells with three copies of each chromosome for a total of 69 chromosomes (called triploid cells) and some cells with the usual 2 copies of each chromosome for a total of 46 chromosomes (called diploid cells).

Having two or more different cell types is called mosaicism. Diploid-triploid mosaicism can be associated with truncal obesity, body/facial asymmetry, weak muscle tone (hypotonia), delays in growth, mild differences in facial features, fusion or webbing between some of the fingers and/or toes (syndactyly) and irregularities in the skin pigmentation.
Intellectual disabilities may be present but are highly variable from person to person ranging from mild to more severe.
The chromosome disorder is usually not present in the blood; a skin biopsy, or analyzing cells in the urine is needed to detect the triploid cells.

A regular human carries 23 pairs of chromosomes in his or her cells. Cells containing two pairs of chromosomes are known as diploid cells. Those with diploid triploid mosaicism have some cells which are triploid, meaning that they have three copies of chromosomes, or a total of 69 chromosomes. Triploidy is distinct from trisomy, in which only one chromosome exists in three pairs. A well-known example of trisomy is trisomy 21 or Down syndrome.

References

External links 

Syndromes with obesity
Chromosomal abnormalities
Syndromes with intellectual disability
Syndromes with dysmelia